Robert Jeffrey Harvey (born 21 August 1971) is an Australian rules football coach and former player. He is currently an assistant coach for the St Kilda Football Club in the Australian Football League. As a player he played his entire career with the St Kilda Football Club in the Australian Football League. He was previously the interim head coach of the Collingwood Football Club.

Harvey was recognized as one of the top 50 players of all time in The Australian Game of Football, a book commissioned by the AFL in 2008 to celebrate the 150th anniversary of Australian rules football. The list was compiled by Herald Sun journalist Mike Sheahan. Harvey was known for his running ability and considered one of the best short passes of 15 to 30 meters in the history of the game. He holds St. Kilda's record for most career games. At his retirement, at the end of the 2008 AFL season, he had played the third-highest total career games in league history, with 383 games. Currently, Robert Harvey ranks sixth in games played (behind Shaun Burgoyne, Dustin Fletcher, Kevin Bartlett, Michael Tuck and Brent Harvey); Harvey was also the final active player from the VFL era of the league (pre-1990) to retire.

Harvey won numerous individual awards and medals during his playing career. He won consecutive Brownlow Medals, the league's highest individual honor, in 1997 and 1998. He won St Kilda's best and fairest award—now called the Trevor Barker Award—in 1992, 1994, 1997 and 1998. He was selected in the All-Australian team eight times, with his first All-Australian award being in 1992 and his last in 2003. He won three E. J. Whitten Medals, awarded to the player judged best player on the ground for Victoria in State of Origin matches; the 1997 AFL Players Association Most Valuable Player Award (now known as the Leigh Matthews Trophy); and the Michael Tuck Medal for player judged best on ground in the 2004 pre-season cup final. In 2012, he was inducted in the Australian Football Hall of Fame. On 24 September 2013, Harvey was named the AFL’s Assistant Coach of the Year at the AFL Coaches Association

Harvey is the grandson of former Australian test cricketer Merv Harvey and grandnephew of Neil Harvey, who was Australia's leading run-scorer and century-maker behind Don Bradman. His younger brother, Anthony Harvey, played four games for St Kilda in 1994 before captaining Norwood to the 1997 SANFL premiership.

Playing career

St Kilda

Early career: 1988–1993
Harvey was recruited from St Kilda's then VCFL zone, from Seaford and played his first senior game for St Kilda on 6 August 1988 against Footscray at the Western Oval in round 19 of the 1988 VFL season. 

Harvey played in the 1991 St Kilda team that qualified for the finals series for the first time since 1973. 

He was a vital player in St Kilda team that qualified for that year's final series and had the club's first finals' win since 1973. He won St Kilda's 1992 award for the best and fairest player (now called the Trevor Barker Award) and was selected in the Australian Team for the first time.

Rising career: 1994–1996
In 1994, he played his 100th premiership season match against North Melbourne in Round 2. He also won his second St Kilda best and fairest award and was selected in the All-Australian Team for a second time. 

In 1995, he was again selected in the All-Australian Team for a third selection. 

Harvey played in St Kilda’s 1996 Ansett Australia Cup winning side, the club's first pre-season cup win. 

He was also selected for the fourth time in the All-Australian Team.

Brownlow Medals and captain: 1997–2003
Harvey played in 22 of 22 matches in the 1997 AFL Premiership Season home and away rounds in which St Kilda Football Club qualified in first position for the 1997 AFL Finals Series, winning the club’s second Minor Premiership and first McClelland Trophy. 

St Kilda qualified for the 1997 AFL Grand Final after qualifying and preliminary finals wins. He played in the 1997 AFL Grand Final in which St Kilda were defeated by 31 points. 

Harvey gained 756 disposals in 1997 which, at the time, was the highest single-season tally on record—an average of 30 possessions per game. He was recognised for his excellent season with numerous awards. He again won St Kilda's best and fairest award and was also selected again in the 1997 All-Australian Team—his fifth All-Australian award. He also won the 1997 AFL Players Association Most Valuable Player Award (now the Leigh Matthews Trophy) and the league's highest individual award the Brownlow Medal. Chris Grant gained the most votes; however, Grant was ineligible to win the award due to a one-match suspension for striking Hawthorn's Nick Holland. 

Harvey played in the St Kilda Football Club side that again qualified for the 1998 Final Series. He played his 200th premiership season match against  in round 21 at Waverley Park. St Kilda was eliminated from the 1998 Finals Series after two consecutive Final Series losses. 

Harvey gained 501 kicks in 1998 which, at the time, was the highest single-season tally on record. He again won the league's highest individual award the Brownlow Medal for the second consecutive season. As of 2020, Harvey is the last man to win two consecutive Brownlow Medals. 

He won the Trevor Barker Award for St Kilda's best and fairest player for a consecutive year—his fourth best and fairest award. He was also again selected in the year's All-Australian Team, his sixth All-Australian award. 

Harvey was selected in the 1999 All-Australian Team—the 6th consecutive year he received an All-Australian selection and his 7th career All-Australian Award. 

Harvey was Captain of the St Kilda Football Club during the 2001 and 2002 AFL Premiership Seasons. He was selected in the 2003 All-Australian Team his eighth All-Australian award. He was named in St Kilda's Team of the Century (1900–1999) in 2003.

Later career and records: 2004–2007
Harvey played in St Kilda’s 2004 Wizard Home Loans Cup final winning side – the club's second pre-season cup win. He was judged best player on the ground in the final and awarded the Michael Tuck Medal. 

St Kilda won a then club record 10 consecutive matches in the first 10 rounds of the 2004 AFL season. The club went on to qualify for the finals inside the top four. 

After a qualifying final loss and a semi-final win, Harvey played his 300th game and became the fourth player to play 300 games for St Kilda, in a preliminary final against Port Adelaide. St Kilda were eliminated from the finals series after a six-point loss. 

In round 7 against Geelong, in front of a near full house at Docklands Stadium, Harvey broke the all-time games record for St Kilda (until then held by Nathan Burke) when he played in his 324th premiership season match. To celebrate the Saints wore special guernseys with Harvey's silhouetted image in the centre. 

Harvey reached his 350th game against West Coast at Subiaco Oval in round 12 when the Saints defeated the reigning premiers by 23 points. 

Harvey played in St Kilda’s 2008 NAB Cup final winning side, which was the club's third pre-season cup win.

21st season and retirement: 2008
In 2008, Harvey became the first player to ever play in 21 consecutive VFL/AFL seasons (however, this has since been overtaken by Dustin Fletcher's current record of 23). At 37 years of age, he played in 24 of St Kilda's 25 premiership season matches—including three finals—averaging 21 disposals per game. He had 31 disposals in another best-on-ground performance in St Kilda's Round 13 win against Fremantle. 

St Kilda qualified for the 2008 finals series inside the top four for the third time in five years. After a qualifying final loss and a semi-final win, Harvey lined up for St Kilda in what turned out to be his final game in the AFL on 20 September 2008 in a preliminary final against Hawthorn at the Melbourne Cricket Ground, which St Kilda lost by 54 points, 9.10 (64) to 18.10 (118). Harvey was chaired off the ground by teammates Lenny Hayes and Max Hudghton to a respectful ovation, while players and officials from both sides formed a guard of honor. After the game, a tribute to his long career was played on the big screen. 

Harvey ended his career having played 383 games at the top level for over 21 seasons, from the age of 16 until he was 37, the second-longest senior career (in terms of seasons) in VFL/AFL history. The only players (at the time) to have played over 400 games in the VFL/AFL, Michael Tuck and Kevin Bartlett, both expressed their disappointment at what they both thought was a premature retirement, believing Harvey could have followed in their footsteps and reached the elusive 400-game milestone. 

Harvey received 215 Brownlow Medal votes during his career, the second-highest tally of any player in league history. He was also the only player in league history to have received Brownlow Medal votes in more than 100 games.

He holds the record for most games played without winning a premiership, but he did participate in 17 finals series matches, including one grand final. He was the last remaining VFL/AFL player left who had played in the 1980s.

State of Origin
Harvey had a prolific State of Origin career. First playing for Victoria in 1991, against South Australia, scoring 2 goals. The following year, he was named in the best players against Western Australia and won the E. J. Whitten Medal against South Australia, scoring 1 goal in the match. In 1993, he participated in the State of Origin Carnival, performing on the big stage in the Grand Final, again winning the E. J. Whitten Medal. He was selected in 1995 against South Australia. In 1996, he won the E. J. Whitten Medal for a record third time, against The Allies, he scored 1 goal. Harvey last played for Victoria in 1997, against South Australia, and was named in the best players. Today, Robert Harvey is still a big supporter of the Victorian State of Origin team.

Statistics

Playing statistics

|- style=background:#EAEAEA
| 1988 ||  || 52
| 4 || 3 || 5 || 41 || 15 || 56 || 7 || 3 || 0.8 || 1.3 || 10.3 || 3.8 || 14.0 || 1.8 || 0.8 || 0
|-
| 1989 ||  || 35
| 12 || 13 || 9 || 136 || 121 || 257 || 42 || 11 || 1.1 || 0.8 || 11.3 || 10.1 || 21.4 || 3.5 || 0.9 || 4
|- style=background:#EAEAEA
| 1990 ||  || 35
| 18 || 13 || 17 || 250 || 193 || 443 || 46 || 15 || 0.7 || 0.9 || 13.9 || 10.7 || 24.6 || 2.6 || 0.8 || 4
|-
| 1991 ||  || 35
| 23 || 16 || 16 || 311 || 294 || 605 || 66 || 24 || 0.7 || 0.7 || 13.5 || 12.8 || 26.3 || 2.9 || 1.0 || 9
|- style=background:#EAEAEA
| 1992 ||  || 35
| 24 || 9 || 6 || 401 || 288 || 689 || 92 || 26 || 0.4 || 0.3 || 16.7 || 12.0 || 28.7 || 3.8 || 1.1 || 12
|-
| 1993 ||  || 35
| 17 || 8 || 10 || 265 || 169 || 434 || 58 || 29 || 0.5 || 0.6 || 15.6 || 9.9 || 25.5 || 3.4 || 1.7 || 12
|- style=background:#EAEAEA
| 1994 ||  || 35
| 18 || 6 || 6 || 262 || 212 || 474 || 42 || 30 || 0.3 || 0.3 || 14.6 || 11.8 || 26.3 || 2.3 || 1.7 || 2
|-
| 1995 ||  || 35
| 17 || 10 || 8 || 234 || 217 || 451 || 47 || 22 || 0.6 || 0.5 || 13.8 || 12.8 || 26.5 || 2.8 || 1.3 || 16
|- style=background:#EAEAEA
| 1996 ||  || 35
| 21 || 12 || 12 || 301 || bgcolor=CAE1FF | 296† || bgcolor=CAE1FF | 597† || 70 || 26 || 0.6 || 0.6 || 14.3 || 14.1 || bgcolor=CAE1FF | 28.4† || 3.3 || 1.2 || 17
|-
| 1997 ||  || 35
| 25 || 18 || 19 || 453 || bgcolor=CAE1FF | 303† || bgcolor=CAE1FF | 756† || 90 || 28 || 0.7 || 0.8 || 18.1 || 12.1 || bgcolor=CAE1FF | 30.2† || 3.6 || 1.1 || bgcolor=98FB98 | 26±
|- style=background:#EAEAEA
| 1998 ||  || 35
| 24 || 13 || 14 || bgcolor=CAE1FF | 501† || 234 || bgcolor=CAE1FF | 735† || 74 || 36 || 0.5 || 0.6 || 20.9 || 9.8 || bgcolor=CAE1FF | 30.6† || 3.1 || 1.5 || bgcolor=98FB98 | 32±
|-
| 1999 ||  || 35
| 17 || 10 || 11 || 299 || 187 || 486 || 59 || 16 || 0.6 || 0.6 || 17.6 || 11.0 || 28.6 || 3.5 || 0.9 || 11
|- style=background:#EAEAEA
| 2000 ||  || 35
| 16 || 5 || 7 || 246 || 193 || 439 || 73 || 20 || 0.3 || 0.4 || 15.4 || 12.1 || 27.4 || 4.6 || 1.3 || 5
|-
| 2001 ||  || 35
| 9 || 9 || 11 || 135 || 85 || 220 || 36 || 20 || 1.0 || 1.2 || 15.0 || 9.4 || 24.4 || 4.0 || 2.2 || 7
|- style=background:#EAEAEA
| 2002 ||  || 35
| 10 || 4 || 4 || 122 || 72 || 194 || 28 || 14 || 0.4 || 0.4 || 12.2 || 7.2 || 19.4 || 2.8 || 1.4 || 7
|-
| 2003 ||  || 35
| 22 || 12 || 11 || 361 || 219 || 580 || 114 || 59 || 0.5 || 0.5 || 16.4 || 10.0 || 26.4 || 5.2 || 2.7 || 18
|- style=background:#EAEAEA
| 2004 ||  || 35
| 23 || 11 || 8 || 301 || 197 || 498 || 100 || 38 || 0.5 || 0.3 || 13.1 || 8.6 || 21.7 || 4.3 || 1.7 || 4
|-
| 2005 ||  || 35
| 17 || 14 || 6 || 208 || 159 || 367 || 90 || 39 || 0.8 || 0.4 || 12.2 || 9.4 || 21.6 || 5.3 || 2.3 || 7
|- style=background:#EAEAEA
| 2006 ||  || 35
| 23 || 18 || 13 || 299 || 177 || 476 || 146 || 73 || 0.8 || 0.6 || 13.0 || 7.7 || 20.7 || 6.3 || 3.2 || 12
|-
| 2007 ||  || 35
| 19 || 4 || 3 || 231 || 161 || 392 || 105 || 36 || 0.2 || 0.2 || 12.2 || 8.5 || 20.6 || 5.5 || 1.9 || 7
|- style=background:#EAEAEA
| 2008 ||  || 35
| 24 || 7 || 4 || 291 || 216 || 507 || 129 || 40 || 0.3 || 0.2 || 12.1 || 9.0 || 21.1 || 5.4 || 1.7 || 3
|- class="sortbottom"
! colspan=3| Career
! 383 !! 215 !! 200 !! 5648 !! 4008 !! 9656 !! 1514 !! 605 !! 0.6 !! 0.5 !! 14.7 !! 10.5 !! 25.2 !! 4.0 !! 1.6 !! 215
|}

Coaching statistics

|- style=background:#EAEAEA
| 2021 || 
| 9 || 2 || 7 || 0 || 22.2% ||  || 18
|- class="sortbottom"
! colspan=2| Career totals
! 9 !! 2 !! 7 !! 0 !! 22.2%
! colspan=2|
|}

Notes

Honours and achievements

Playing
Team
 Minor premiership: 1997
 3× Pre-Season premiership player: 1996, 2004, 2008

Individual
 2× Brownlow Medal: 1997, 1998
 Leigh Matthews Trophy (AFLPA MVP Award): 1997
 8× All-Australian team: 1992, 1994, 1995, 1996, 1997, 1998, 1999, 2003
 4× Trevor Barker Award: 1992, 1994, 1997, 1998
 Australian Football Media Association Player of the Year Award: 1997
 Herald Sun Player of the Year Award: 1997
 Michael Tuck Medal: 2004
 Madden Medal: 2008
  Team of the Century

Coaching
Individual
 AFLCA assistant coach of the year: 2013

Halls of fame
 Australian Football Hall of Fame inductee
  Hall of Fame inductee – Legend status

Coaching career

Carlton Football Club assistant coach (2008-2010)
On 10 October 2008, it was announced that Harvey was being appointed as a development and fitness coach at the Carlton Football Club from 2009.
On 2 November 2009, he was promoted from development coach to midfield coach at Carlton and served as a more direct assistant coach under senior coach Brett Ratten.

St Kilda Football Club assistant coach (2010-2011)
It was formally announced by the Carlton and St Kilda football clubs, on 13 September 2010, that Harvey had accepted an offer to return to St Kilda as an assistant coach beginning with the 2011 pre-season, in the position of St Kilda midfield coach. 

Following Ross Lyon's departure from the Saints in mid-September 2011, Harvey assumed the role as caretaker head coach while the search for a new senior coach commenced at St Kilda.

On being overlooked for St Kilda's senior coaching role, Harvey was released from his assistant coaching obligations with St Kilda.

Collingwood Football Club assistant coach (2011-2021)
Harvey joined the Collingwood Football Club in October 2011 as midfield coach under Nathan Buckley and was promoted to senior assistant coach during 2013. On 24 September 2013, Harvey was named the AFL's Assistant Coach of the Year at the AFL Coaches Association awards.

Collingwood Football Club caretaker senior coach (2021)
After Nathan Buckley resigned as Collingwood Football Club senior coach in June 2021, Harvey assumed the role as caretaker senior coach, effective from round 14 of the 2021 AFL season. Harvey then left the club at the end of the 2021 season, after he came to a mutual agreement with the club that a change was needed for both parties in  the decision that Harvey would not be retained as Collingwood Football Club senior coach. Harvey described the discussions as “pretty transparent” and that he left “on good terms”. Harvey was replaced by Craig McRae as Collingwood Football Club senior coach.

Hawthorn Football Club assistant coach (2021-2022)
On 22 September 2021, it was announced that Harvey would join  as an assistant coach under senior coach Sam Mitchell.

St Kilda Football Club assistant coach (2022-present)
Following the appointment of Ross Lyon as senior coach, it was announced in October 2022 that Harvey would be returning to St Kilda as an assistant coach.

Personal life
Harvey is married to Danielle Harvey. Danielle appeared on Fox Footy's Living With Footballers before it was cancelled at the end of 2004. They have three children: son Connor and daughters Remi and Alyssa.

References

External links

See also
Harvey family

Trevor Barker Award winners
1971 births
Living people
All-Australians (AFL)
Australian rules footballers from Melbourne
Brownlow Medal winners
Leigh Matthews Trophy winners
St Kilda Football Club players
Victorian State of Origin players
People educated at Haileybury (Melbourne)
Australian Football Hall of Fame inductees
E. J. Whitten Medal winners
Australian people of Cornish descent
Australia international rules football team players
Robert
People from the City of Frankston